Epilogism is a style of inference used by the ancient Empiric school of medicine. It is a theory-free method that looks at history through the accumulation of facts without major generalization and with consideration of the consequences of making causal claims. Epilogism is an inference which moves entirely within the domain of visible and evident things, it tries not to invoke unobservables.

Concept 

There are conflicting accounts as to who introduced epilogism. It has been, for instance, attributed to Menodotus of Nicomedia as well as to Heracleides of Tarentum, who was an Epicurean. Menodotus' use of this notion was included in the extant Latin version of Galen's Subfiguratio empirica, where it was described as the third method in addition to perception and recollection.

It is also said that the empirics devised epilogism to distinguish their kind of reasoning from the type used by the rationalists, which required an understanding of the underlying nature of things, including the link between consequence and exclusion drawn between states of affairs. Some also consider epilogism as the most extreme form of reasoning acceptable to the empirics.

For the empirics, epilogism was reasoning that focused on a temporarily hidden subject. It was employed as a method to uncover the provisionally hidden subjects, which are not entirely inaccessible to experience. It covered the ground addressed by the commemorative sign and featured the ordinary reasoning common to all human beings. It also had an exclusive focus on the phenomena and simply reported (without endorsing) the practice of the empirical doctor. As a medical method, it was used to infer the existence of something that is temporarily unclear, but in principle observable.

In medical instruction, empirics use epilogism as one of the three sources or tripod of empiric medicine, along with personal observation and the study of observations collected by others. In this case, the term, which is also called analogism, pertains to the induction that is derived from two former sources.

Cultural depictions
Epilogism is discussed as a way of viewing history in The Black Swan: The Impact of the Highly Improbable by Nassim Nicholas Taleb.

See also
 Transduction (machine learning)
 Predictive state representation

References

External links
  http://bmcr.brynmawr.edu/2004/2004-12-20.html
  repository.kulib.kyoto-u.ac.jp/dspace/bitstream/2433/24239/1/nishimura.pdf

Sources of knowledge
Ancient Greek medicine
Theories of deduction
Empiricism